The Araya and Paria xeric scrub (NT1301) is an ecoregion in Venezuela that stretches along the Caribbean coast to the west of Trinidad, and that includes Margarita Island and some smaller islands. The ecoregion includes dune herbs, dry thorn scrubs and deciduous forests. 
The mountains on Margarita Island hold montane forests similar to those in the mainland coastal range.
The beaches are used for breeding by sea turtles. 
Some endemic bird species are threatened with extinction by illegal capture for the pet trade.
Deforestation and over-grazing by goats are also problems.

Geography

Location
The west of the ecoregion covers the Araya Peninsula and the coastal area around Cumaná to the south of the peninsula.
The ecoregion covers the coastal area to the east of the Araya Peninsula, and extends over parts of the Paria Peninsula.
It excludes two mountain areas of the Paria peninsula, which are in the Cordillera de la Costa montane forests ecoregion.
To the north it includes the Margarita, Cubagua and Coche islands in the Caribbean.

Parts of the coast of the mainland and Margarita Island are lined with Amazon-Orinoco-Southern Caribbean mangroves.
To the south the Araya and Paria xeric scrub transitions into La Costa xeric shrublands.
The most northern arm of the Orinoco Delta swamp forests reaches the ecoregion in the east.

Terrain

The region is part of the Venezuelan Coastal Range, formed during the Tertiary period.
The rocks are mostly schist and gneisses, in some places underlain by granites.
The soils are mostly entisols and ultisols.

The larger, eastern part of the island is mountainous, with peaks that rise to the  Cerro El Copey.
The center of the island forms a coastal plain with sandy beaches and areas of dunes.
This is connected by an isthmus to the western part, the Macanao Peninsula, which contains a line of mountains of which the  Cerro Macanao is the highest.

The west of the Araya Peninsula holds the Salina de Araya, a sandy plain that is often flooded by the sea.
From here a line of hills extends to the east, with their highest point formed by the  Cerro San José.
East of the hills there is a region of low country that extends to the mountainous area of the Paria Peninsula.
The Araya-Paria Peninsula is joined to the mainland by the Cariaco-Yaguaraparo isthmus.
The ecoregion extends along the mainland coast over lower mountains to the Cumaná region.

Climate

The climate varies considerably in different parts of the ecoregion.
In the coastal region from the center of the Araya-Paria Peninsula to Cumaná there are wet seasons from June to August, and around year end.

At Carúpano, mid-way along the Araya-Paria Peninsula the Köppen climate classification is "Aw": equatorial, winter dry.
Margarita Island also has wet seasons from June to August, and around year end.
Temperatures average , but may be higher in the arid lowlands and lower in the mountains.

Ecology

The ecoregion is in the neotropical realm, in the deserts and xeric shrublands biome.

Flora

Paria has a patchwork of bamboo forests and scrub.
The coast is lined with coconut palms, mangroves, fishing villages and resorts.
The interior holds scrub, deciduous thorn woods, pastures and agricultural fields.
The coastal range of the ecoregion has areas of salt-tolerant coastal herbs, areas of coastal dune herbs, and areas of coastal dry thorn scrubs. 
Open communities of short salt-tolerant herbs are found in depressions that are often flooded by the sea, including species such as Atriplex pentandra, Batis maritima, Heterostachys ritteriana, Salicornia fruticosa and Sesuvium portulacastrum. 
Low open to dense communities of herb cover sandy dunes with species such as Cakile lanceolata, Cyperus planifolius, Euphorbia buxifolia, Ipomoea pes-caprae, Portulaca pilosa, Scaevola plumieri and  Sporobolus virginicus.

Typical plants are Prosopis and Parkinsonia species, Bourreria cumanensis,  Opuntia caribaea and Stenocereus griseus.
On the mainland and Paria Peninsula the low deciduous forests have middle density and well-developed understoreys.
Common species around the mainland Turimiquire massif include Bauhinia aculeata, Bourreria cumanensis, Bursera simaruba, Pereskia guamacho and Tabebuia billbergii. 
Common species on the Paria Peninsula are  Cynophalla hastata, Diospyros inconstans, Jacquinia revoluta and Maytenus sieberiana.

Plants of the Cerro Copey range on Margarita Island closely resemble those of the Cordillera de la Costa montane forest.
Common species include  Aspidosperma vargasii, Bursera simaruba, Clusia rosea, Coccoloba coronata, Croton xanthochloros, Machaerium robiniifolium, Maytenus karstenii, Neea anisophylla, Tabebuia billbergii, and Ximenia americana.
Common species include Bactris setulosa, Dendropanax arboreus, Euterpe precatoria, Guapira ofersiana, Inga macrantha, Margaritaria nobilis, Myrcianthes compressa, Nectandra coriacea and Tabebuia chrysantha. 
Endemic flora in the Cerro Copey range include Argythamnia erubescens, Blakea monticola, Clerodendrum margaritense, Croton margaritensis, Inga macrantha and Mikania johnstonii.

Fauna

The Macanao Peninsula and the westernmost part of the Araya Peninsula are important areas for threatened neotropical birds, particularly the yellow-shouldered amazon (Amazona barbadensis), which is in demand for the pet trade.
The subspecies Margarita blue-crowned parakeet (Thectocercus acuticaudatus neoxena) found in the mangroves around the La Restinga lagoon, is also threatened by pet trade.
The lagoon complex around Cumaná, the Golf of Cariaco salina and the Araya peninsula lagoons provide refuges to many species of birds. 
The Chacopata Lagoon has the largest pelican colony in Venezuela, and is used by large groups of flamingos.
Beaches on Margarita are used for breeding by the loggerhead sea turtle (Caretta caretta) and green sea turtle (Chelonia mydas).
The north coast of the Paria Peninsula is the main nesting zone for the leatherback sea turtle (Dermochelys coriacea) in Venezuela.
Maragarita is home to subspecies of the eastern cottontail (Sylvilagus floridanus margaritae) and the Margaritan tufted capuchin (Sapajus apella margaritae).

Status

The World Wildlife Fund gives the ecoregion the status of "Critical/Endangered".
Deforestation and exploitation of sand and gravel around streams in Macanao threatens the habitat of the Yellow-shouldered Amazon.
The capture for trade of Yellow-shouldered Amazon and blue-crowned Parakeet threaten these species with extinction.
All the dry vegetation in Araya and Macanao is at risk from overgrazing by goats.
Adventure tourists drive vehicles along the protected beaches of La Restinga National Park and destroy turtle nests.
The Cumaná lagoons are threatened by urbanization, pollution and introduction of exotic species.

Protected areas include the Kronstadt Island Wildlife Sanctuary and the Mochima National Park.
Protected areas in Margarita Island include the  Cerro El Copey National Park, the Cerro Matasiete and the Guayamurí Natural Monument, which together cover most of the forest on the island. 
The  Laguna de la Restinga National Park on the northern Macanao Peninsular protects mangroves and some adjoining arid areas.
The Laguna de Las Marites Natural Monument also protects mangroves. 
Within it is Las Tetas de María Guevara Monument, which also protects some arid areas.

Notes

Sources

Neotropical ecoregions
Ecoregions of Venezuela
Deserts and xeric shrublands